The City University of Hong Kong Law Review (often CityU LR) is a student-edited and peer-reviewed law journal published by the School of Law of the City University of Hong Kong. It was established in October 2009. The journal features articles, notes, book reviews, and recent legal developments in Hong Kong as well as mainland China. The journal is published bi-annually and is available on HeinOnline and Westlaw.

Aims and objectives 
The journal aims to:
 publish papers on cutting-edge issues in diverse areas of law
 provide a forum for members of legal fraternity in Hong Kong and overseas to engage in dialogue on contemporary global and local legal issues
 keep readers up to date on recent legal developments taken place in mainland China, Hong Kong, and Macau
 encourage law students to publish in a scholarly journal with international audience
 harness the writing, editing and research skills of law students

Editorial board 
The journal is edited by a selected group of LLB and JD students from the City University of Hong Kong School of Law. 20 students are selected yearly. They are handpicked based on their academic performance, language skills, past editing experience and writing abilities. The student members of the Board are supported by the faculty editor and an international board of advisors.

Submission criteria 
The journal accepts submissions on a rolling basis throughout the year. A stringent selection process is adopted to single out suitable papers for publication. All papers are reviewed anonymously by the Board members via a double-blind peer review process. Attributes such as its topicality, originality, persuasiveness, structure, level of research and language will be considered. Any submitted papers must address current legal issues which are of interest in the Asia-Pacific region. It should also introduce unique perspectives and insights on the subject concerned in a cohesive and persuasive manner. Authors are also expected to demonstrate reasonable standard of research by accurately stating the laws and legal concepts with adequate references.

Notable articles 

 Roger Hood, ‘Abolition of the Death Penalty: China in World Perspective’ (2009) 1 CityU LR 1
 David Weissbrodt, ‘The Administration of Justice and Human Rights’ (2009) 1 CityU LR 23
 Adrian Zuckerman, ‘The Challenge of Civil Justice Reform: Effective Court Management of Litigation’ (2009) 1 CityU LR 49
 Christopher Michaelsen, ‘The Proportionality Principle, Counter-terrorism Laws and Human Rights: A German-Australian Comparison’ (2010) 2 CityU LR 19
 Nicola McGarrity & George Williams, ‘Counter-Terrorism Laws in a Nation without a Bill of Rights: The Australian Experience’ (2010) 2 CityU LR 45
 Michael Hor, ‘Singapore Criminal Law: Examining the Etiology of Exception’ (2010) 2 CityU LR 81
 Christina Binder, ‘Economic Growth at the Price of Human Rights Violations? The Protection of Human/Labour Rights in Export Processing Zones’ (2010) 2 CityU LR 99
 Richard Meeran, ‘Tort Litigation against Multinational Corporations for Violation of Human Rights: An Overview of the Position Outside the United States’ (2011) 3 CityU LR 1
 Mark Kielsgard, ‘Sentencing Insights in the International Crimes Court of Cambodia’ (2011) 3 CityU LR 43
 Janice Chin Poh Wah, ‘Improving Corporate Governance in China through Differentiated Listing Segments: Lessons from the Brazilian Novo Mercado’ (2011) 3 CityU LR 141
 Tom Papain, ‘The Convention on the Rights of the Child: How North Korea Is Violating a Child's Right to a Quality Education’ (2011) 3 CityU LR 65

External links 
 

Law journals edited by students
Publications established in 2009
Biannual journals
English-language journals